Thomas Gaff House could refer to:
Hillforest, the Thomas Gaff House, in Indiana
Thomas T. Gaff House, in Washington, D.C.